Kia Corporation, commonly known as Kia (stylized as KИ, ; formerly known as Kyungsung Precision Industry and Kia Motors Corporation), is a South Korean multinational automobile manufacturer headquartered in Seoul, South Korea. It is South Korea's second largest automobile manufacturer, after its parent company, Hyundai Motor Company, with sales of over 2.8 million vehicles in 2019.  the Kia Corporation is minority owned by Hyundai, which holds a 33.88% stake valued at just over US$6 billion. Kia in turn is a minority owner of more than twenty Hyundai subsidiaries ranging from 4.9% up to 45.37%, totaling more than US$8.3 billion.

Etymology 

History

Origins and early expansion
Kia was founded on June 9, 1944, as Kyungsung Precision Industry, a manufacturer of steel tubing and bicycle parts, eventually producing Korea's first domestic bicycle, the Samchully, in 1951. In 1952, Kyungsung Precision Industry changed its name to Kia Industries, and later built Honda-licensed small motorcycles (starting in 1957) and Mazda-licensed trucks (1962) and cars (1974). The company opened its first integrated automotive assembly plant in 1973, the Sohari Plant. Kia built the small Mazda-based Brisa range of cars until 1981, when production came to an end after the new military dictator Chun Doo-hwan enforced industry consolidation. This forced Kia to give up passenger cars and focus entirely on light trucks. Kia assembled a few hundred more cars in 1982 and 1983, after the ban had taken effect, but no passenger cars were built in 1984 and 1985.

Prior to the forced 1981 shutdown, Kia had rounded out its passenger car lineup with two other foreign models assembled under license: the Fiat 132 and the Peugeot 604. The import of these knock-down kits was permitted as long as Kia exported five cars for every single Fiat or Peugeot brought in (Hyundai had to meet the same requirement).

Starting in 1986 (when only 26 cars were manufactured, followed by over 95,000 the next year), Kia rejoined the automobile industry in partnership with Ford. Kia produced several Mazda-derived vehicles for both domestic sales in South Korea and for export into other countries - where they were positioned at the budget end of the market. These models included the Kia Pride, based on the Mazda 121 and the Avella, which were sold in North America and Australasia as the Ford Festiva and Ford Aspire. In 1992, Kia Motors America was incorporated in the United States. The first Kia-branded vehicles in the United States were sold from four dealerships in Portland, Oregon, in 1992. Since then, Kia methodically expanded one region at a time. Dealers in 1994 sold the Sephia and a few years later the United States segment expanded their line with the Sportage. Over one hundred Kia dealerships existed across thirty states by 1995, selling a record 24,740 automobiles.

Hyundai Motor Company takeover
Kia declared bankruptcy in 1997, during the Asian financial crisis, and in 1998 reached an agreement with Hyundai Motor Company to diversify by exchanging ownership between the two companies. Hyundai Motor Company acquired 51% of the company, outbidding Ford Motor Company, which had owned an interest in Kia Motors since 1986. After subsequent divestments, Hyundai Motor Company owns about one third of Kia Motor Corporation. While Hyundai Motor Company remains Kia's largest stakeholder, Kia Motor Company also retains ownership in some 22 Hyundai Motor Company subsidiaries. Since 2005, Kia has focused on the European market and has identified design as its "core future growth engine" – leading to the hiring of Peter Schreyer in 2006 as chief design officer and his subsequent creation of a new corporate grille known as the 'Tiger Nose'. In October 2006, Kia Motors America broke ground for Kia Motors Manufacturing Georgia in West Point, Georgia, representing a US$1 billion investment for the company. Kia Motors Manufacturing Georgia opened in February 2010, after Kia recorded its 15th consecutive year of increased U.S. market share. In August 2014, the company received international attention when Pope Francis of the Catholic Church rode in one of their compact cars, the Kia Soul, during a five-day visit to South Korea. The Kia Soul drew bigger attention than two other vehicles used by the Pope, their Kia Carnival and Hyundai's Santa Fe, because it appeared in the high-profile welcoming ceremony of his arrival at the Seoul Airport on August 14. In 2016, Kia Motors model reliability was ranked first in the United States by J.D. Power and Associates, becoming the first non-luxury automaker since 1989 to top that list.

Kia started using an angular "KIA" wordmark logo in early 2021. The logo uses an "I" and an oblique "A" without a crossbar immediately next to each other, which some consumers have misread as the stylized "KИ" as "KN".

Board of Directors
As of January 2021:
 Chung Eui-sun, Chairman of Hyundai Motor Group
 Song Ho-sung, President and CEO of Kia Corporation
 Jun-Young Choi, Executive Vice President of Kia Corporation
 Woo-Jeong Joo, Executive Vice President & CFO of Kia Corporation
 Sang-Koo Nam, Professor of Business Administration at Gachon University
 Chol-Su Han, Advisor at Yoon & Yang Law Firm
 Duk-Joong Kim, Advisor at Yoon & Yang Law Firm
 Dong-One Kim, Professor of Business School at Korea University
 Wha-Sun Jho, full-time member of the policy department of the Korea Academy of Science and Technology and Professor of Political Science and Diplomacy at Yonsei University

Affiliates and subsidiaries

Hyundai Motor Company 
, the Hyundai Motor Company owns a 33.88% stake in Kia Motors. Likewise, as of December 31, 2015, Kia Motors is a part owner of 22 Hyundai companies. Its ownership percentages range from 4.9% to 45.37%.

Kia America 

Kia America, Inc. was incorporated in California on October 21, 1992, and became the American sales, marketing, and distribution arm of Kia Corporation. KMA is based in Irvine, California, and currently offers a complete line of vehicles through more than 755 dealers throughout the United States. The first two models that were introduced to the U.S. market in 1993 were KIA Sephia and Kia Sportage 4x4. In the United States, sales began in late 1993 for the 1994 model year. The two models most recently introduced to the U.S. market have both been highly awarded during the short time since their launch: the 2018 Stinger performance sedan gained recognition with J.D. Power's inaugural Engineering Award for Highest Rated All-New Vehicle as well as Business Insider's Car of the Year Award, then the 2020 Telluride made its mark several times over by winning major awards from review organizations like Kelley Blue Book, MotorTrend, Hispanic Motor Press (www.hispanicmotorpress.org) also awarded the Telluride as the best SUV for 2020, and most recently Edmunds.

As a brand, KMA has continued to improve over the years as well; in 2013, Kia Motors America recorded its 18th consecutive year of increased U.S. market share, and for the past five consecutive years (2015-2019) it has been recognized by J.D. Power as the highest ranked mass market brand in initial quality.

In November 2009, Kia started production at the first U.S. Kia Motors plant, Kia Motors Manufacturing Georgia, in West Point. Though the Kia Sorento crossover vehicle was the only model to be assembled there at first, the facility has since expanded its production lines to include the Kia Optima mid-size sedan, now sold as the K5, in 2011 and the just-launched Kia Telluride crossover SUV in January 2019. As of September 2019, the location has successfully built over 3 million units of these three models altogether, and shortly after celebrated another milestone by reaching its 10th year of production in November 2019. Currently, the facility has a production capacity of 340,000 vehicles per year (largely dedicated to the Telluride and Sorento crossover SUVs) and is responsible for distributing them to hundreds of dealerships in the US and Canada, as well as fulfilling shipments across North America and even overseas.

Kia Canada 

Kia Canada was formed in 1999 as a subsidiary of Kia Motors Corporation serving the Canadian market. It is headquartered in Mississauga, Ontario, where it employs approximately 180 people. Kia Canada is best known for its mid-market lineup of sport utility vehicles and crossovers, which are midway in size between SUVs and ordinary sedans, and increasingly for its electric vehicles and plug-in hybrids. In 2021, Kia Canada introduced a new logo and slogan, "Movement that inspires". As of 2021, Kia Canada sold nearly 80,000 vehicles a year.

Kia Central & South America Corp. 
Kia Central & South America Corp. is an incorporated division of Kia Corporation in charge of sales and marketing in 43 countries across Central and South America (including Brazil), and the Caribbean. The regional headquarters is located in Miami, Florida (US).

Kia Europe 
Kia Europe is the European sales and marketing division of Kia Corporation. It has been selling cars in Europe since the first half of 1991.

In 2007, KME moved from its previous location at Hauptstrasse 185, Eschborn (near Frankfurt), to a new purpose-built facility adjacent to the Messe, in Frankfurt city centre.

When Kia launched in Europe during 1991, it initially sold only the Pride supermini – a rebadged version of the late 1980s Mazda 121. It initially proved popular with buyers. By the end of 1991, Kia had sold nearly 1,800 Prides in the United Kingdom. The first full year, 1992, saw that figure double, and, in 1993, it increased again to nearly 5,500 units. However, sales fell towards the end of the decade, and the end of production was finally announced in May 2000, with its successor – the Rio – not going on sale for another year.

From 1995 to 1999, Kia produced left- and right-hand drive versions of the first generation Sportage SUV at the Karmann factory in Osnabrück, Germany. These have been popular across Europe, but, since 2002, Kia has gained more sales in this market thanks to the launch of the larger Sorento. From 1999 until production of the model ceased in 2003, all Sportage production reverted to South Korea.

The European range also expanded in the spring of 1994 when Kia began importing the larger Mentor, a range of medium-sized hatchbacks and sedans which were marketed as inexpensive and well-equipped alternatives to the likes of the Ford Escort and the Vauxhall/Opel Astra.

A facelift in 1999 saw the Mentor name retained for the saloon (sedan), but the hatchback was renamed Shuma. These models remained on sale until 2004, when the newer Cerato was launched and gave Kia one of its first serious competitors against mainstream brands. The Clarus saloon and Sedona MPV were also launched onto the UK market during 1999, helping Kia begin its rise in popularity.

Despite Kia's range increasing from one car as late as 1993, to three cars by the end of 1995, British sales actually decreased in that period, from nearly 5,500 in 1993 to less than 4,000 the following year. In 1998, Kia's future in Britain was thrown into serious doubt when it sold less than 3,000 of its whole range – the worst in any full year on the British market. Kia did not enter Europe's large family car market until the launch of its Clarus four-door sedan in 1999 – a year behind schedule due to the financial difficulties that Kia was facing before it was taken over by Hyundai. This car was similar in size to the Ford Mondeo and the Opel/Vauxhall Vectra, but, on its launch, was actually less expensive to buy than the smaller Focus and the Astra. It had a spacious interior, large boot, competitive asking price, and high equipment levels, but it had little more appeal to sway buyers away from established European brands like Ford, Vauxhall/Opel and Peugeot.

Its successor, the Magentis, launched in 2001, was still nowhere near as popular as Kia might have hoped it would be, although with a sub-£14,000 asking price it offered the cheapest V6-engined car in the UK, by which time it was rare enough for a six-cylinder car to be priced at less than £20,000.

Kia entered the MPV market in 1999 with the Sedona. On its launch, it was the lowest-priced, full-size people carrier on sale in the United Kingdom. With the range expanded by 1999, sales for that year reached almost 6,400 – more than double the previous year's total. That annual sales figure had almost been matched in 2000 by the end of May, reflecting Kia's growing popularity with British buyers. By 2009, Kia was firmly established as a popular brand in Britain, when sales broke the 50,000 barrier for the first time and the brand now had a share of more than 2% in the new car market. The Picanto was the most popular single model with nearly 17,000 sales.

In late 2006, Kia opened its first own plant in Europe at a cost of approximately EUR 1.7 billion in Žilina, Slovakia, in the village of Teplička nad Váhom, after construction between October 2004 and December 2005. It has since produced over 2.5 million units of the Kia Cee'd, Kia Sportage and Kia Venga, as well as seven types of engines. In 2016, 339,500 cars and 612,915 engines were manufactured. The area of the plant is 166 ha and Mobis Slovakia, the largest supplier, is situated right on the carmaker's premises. As of December 31, 2016, 3,625 employees worked in the facility, while their average age was 35. The relatively low number of employees working in three shifts is related to a high degree of automation as well as high integration with Mobis Slovakia. In 2016, Kia Motors Slovakia recorded revenue of EUR 5.56 billion. Although the European car market knew significant difficulties, Kia announced increased sales in 2013.

Kia Mexico 
The company has built a $1 billion manufacturing plant in the northern Mexican state of Nuevo León, which produces 300,000 cars a year. Details of the factory, built in the city of Pesquería, were revealed in a joint press conference given by Kia CEO Hyoung-Keun Lee and the President of Mexico Enrique Peña Nieto in Mexico City on August 28, 2014. The plant was expected to be completed in the first half of 2016. This factory is involved in controversies because it was built on unevenly purchased land, and the construction agreement was made with advantage conditions and out of the local dispositions to Kia.

Kia India 

The company has entered the Indian market in July 2019 with their 'Made for India' SUV- SP2 Concept now announced as the global mid-sized SUV Kia Seltos. N. Chandrababu Naidu is lauded to have signed an MOU for the government of Andhra Pradesh which came to be one of the biggest FDI's with a total investment of Rs.12,900 crore.  The company has built a production facility on a Greenfield land in Anantpur district, Andhra Pradesh near Penukonda. The annual production capacity is 300,000 units. Kia has appointed Kookhyun Shim as MD & CEO for its Indian arm. In his new role, Shim will be responsible for leading the carmaker's expansion in the Indian market. Shim will play a leading role in ensuring KI's projected timeline and schedule of operations is achieved. He also oversaw the construction of Kia's first manufacturing facility in India, to help strengthen the company's position in the fifth largest global automotive market. Kia has committed investments to the tune of $1.1 billion to develop operations in India including investing in a network of over 250 customer touch-points that include service, sales and spares establishments.

On 31 July 2020, Kia crossed 100,000 car sales in India becoming the fastest car manufacturer to do so.

Kia Lucky Motors Pakistan 

Kia Lucky Motors (KLM) is a joint venture in Pakistan between Kia Motors and Lucky Cement. Kia Lucky Motors Pakistan began selling cars in 2018 when they launched their All New Grand Carnival in Pakistan. In quarter 4 2019, Kia Pakistan introduced two new locally manufactured products known as Kia Sportage and Kia Picanto.

Kia Defense 

Kia Motors has specialized in the production of military vehicles with variants and other transportation equipment and by supplying them as a sole maker of military vehicles designated by the South Korean Government since 1976, when Kia Heavy Industry Co. Ltd. (now known as Hyundai Wia) was established. Kia is currently designing a Kaiser Jeep M715-type vehicle named the KM450 for the South Korean Army on license from the U.S. Government. Kia is also the owner of the former ex-Asia Motors factory in Gwangju.

Models

Sales figures

Facilities

Design emphasis 
Beginning in 2006 Kia identified design as its "core future growth engine" – leading to the 2006 hiring of Peter Schreyer and to the 2005 hiring Tom Kearns as Chief Design Officer. Schreyer had previously worked at Audi (designing the Audi TT) and Volkswagen and had won the Design Award of the Federal Republic of Germany. Kearns had previously worked at Cadillac as Chief Design Officer and was responsible for influencing Cadillac's direction of hard angles and sharp lines within their design. Schreyer has since been central to a complete restyling of Kia's line-up, overseeing design activities at Kia's design centers in Frankfurt, Los Angeles, Tokyo, and the Namyang Design Center in South Korea. With the Kee concept vehicle, shown at the Frankfurt Motor Show in 2007, Kia introduced a new corporate grille to create a recognizable 'face' for the brand. Known as the Tiger Nose, Schreyer indicated he wanted "a powerful visual signal, a seal, an identifier. The front of a car needs this recognition, this expression. A car needs a face and I think the new Kia face is strong and distinctive. Visibility is vital and that face should immediately allow you to identify a Kia even from a distance." Schreyer described how the Kia Tiger Nose came to be as he explained, "I was just working on the car and just thinking about different possibilities, and suddenly I found it." Commenting on the new signature grille in 2009: "From now on, we'll have it on all our cars". Kia has since featured the Tiger Nose on all of their vehicles, ranging from the compact Kia Soul, on to the edgy new design of the Kia Optima, and to the larger SUV, the Kia Telluride. Kia cars won Road & Travel Magazine's International Car of the Year award in 2013, 2014 and 2015.

Controversies 
In late 2012, Kia Motors was forced to admit error in inflating its United States Environmental Protection Agency mileage claims and had to reduce its fuel economy claims in the U.S. by about 3 percent across the board and to offer compensation to previous vehicle buyers.

Nuevo León plant 
Since 2014, Kia Motors has been involved in controversies in Mexico due to alleged irregularities in the construction of one of its manufacturing plants, located in the municipality of Pesquería, Nuevo León. The construction of the plant was done in an irregularly purchased land agreement between Kia Motors Mexico and the State of Nuevo León, then headed by Rodrigo Medina de la Cruz, was signed with unfairly advantageous conditions, such as bigger tax incentives than those allowed by Mexican law (tax exemptions for 20 years when the standard is 5), extended to the Mexican providers of Kia. A copy of the full agreement was published in Facebook by current Nuevo León governor, Jaime Rodríguez Calderón, as part of a prosecution case against Medina and he declared that the signed agreement with his predecessor would be cancelled. A new agreement was then reached with Rodriguez's administration in June 2016. Former governor Medina de la Cruz and 30 other officials of the former state administration were investigated by an anti-corruption prosecutor for alleged embezzlement, improper exercise of public functions and damage to Nuevo León State assets. Medina was then taken into custody on January 26, 2017, in relation to this case and others in which he is involved.

Sponsorship 

Kia Motors sponsors the following sports teams, events, venues, and athletes:

Venues 

 Kia Arena
 Kia Forum
 Kia Oval

Sports associations 

 League of Legends European Championship (LEC)
 FIFA
 UEFA
 Liga ACB
 National Basketball Association (NBA)
 Women's National Basketball Association (WNBA)

Sports events 
 Archery World Cup
 Asian Games
 Australian Open (tennis tournament)
 Copa América
 FIBA Asia Championship
 FIFA World Cup
 Kia Classic (LPGA)
 Kia Lotos Race
 Kia Super League (cricket)
 Korea Speed Festival
 UEFA Europa League
 Universiade
 X Games
 X Games Asia

Sports teams 
 A.C. Monza (Italian association football team)
 Atlanta Falcons
 Atlético Madrid (Spanish professional football club, from 2005 to 2011)
 B-SAD (Portugal association football team)
 Bengaluru FC (Indian professional Football Club, from 2018 to 2020)
 Boston United FC (English Football Club)
 Brisbane Broncos (National Rugby League)
 Canterbury-Bankstown Bulldogs (National Rugby League)
 DWG KIA (South Korean professional esports organization)
 England women's cricket team
 FC Hansa Rostock (German association football team, from 1999 to 2002)
 FC Steaua București (Romanian association football team)
 Greater Western Sydney Giants (Australian Football League)
 Kia Forte (Shakey's V-League)
 Kia Picanto (Philippine Basketball Association)
 Kia Speed Skating Academy
 Kia Tigers (Korean Baseball Team in Gwangju, South Korea)
 Philippines national football team
 Qormi FC (Maltese association football team)
 Rogue (European professional esports organization)
 Slovakia national football team
 South Korea national speed skating team
 Surrey County Cricket Club
 Udinese Calcio (Italian association football team, from 2004 to 2006)
 Waikato Bay of Plenty Magic

Athletes 
 Ryan Ford (MMA fighter)
 Fernando González (Chilean tennis player – 2004 & 2008 Olympic medalist)
 Badr Hari (Moroccan kickboxer)
 LeBron James (Global brand ambassador)
 Blake Griffin (NBA basketball player)
 Lee Sang-hwa (Speed skater)
 Yulia Lipnitskaya (Russian figure skater)
 Aliya Mustafina and Viktoria Komova (both Russian artistic gymnasts)
 Rafael Nadal (Global brand ambassador)
 Manny Pacquiao (Filipino boxer)
 Adelina Sotnikova (Russian figure skater)
 Michelle Wie (Official golf ambassador & spokesperson – KMA)
 Dylan Alcott (Australian tennis player)
 Eric Keogh (Kia Race Series winner 2 years in a row)

Actors 
 Pierce Brosnan
 Laurence Fishburne
 Christopher Walken
 Tiger Shroff

Musicians 
 Blackpink
 Chase Bryant
 Hyolyn
 Matthew Koma
 MisterWives
 Weezer

Music events 
 Live at The chapel (Australian music concert)
 Vans Warped Tour
 YouTube Music Awards (2013)
 Melon Music Awards (2019)

Charity events 
 We Can Be Heroes (joint-venture between Kia and DC Comics);

Entertainment 
 Inside the NBA
 Tobot
 X-Men

Slogans 
  (2000–2006)
  (2006–2021)
  (2019–2021, United States)
 (2021–present, Worldwide)

See also 

 List of Kia design and manufacturing facilities
 Automotive industry in South Korea
 Hyundai Motor Group
 Kia EcoDynamics
 Economy of South Korea

References

External links 

 
  (Local)
 Kia Military Vehicles official site

Kia Motors
Car manufacturers of South Korea
Bus manufacturers of South Korea
Truck manufacturers of South Korea
Defence companies of South Korea
Hyundai Motor Group
Multinational companies headquartered in South Korea
Manufacturing companies based in Seoul
Vehicle manufacturing companies established in 1944
1944 establishments in the Japanese colonial empire
Companies listed on the Korea Exchange
South Korean brands
Car brands
Motor vehicle engine manufacturers
Engine manufacturers of South Korea